LV, Lv or lv may refer to:

Arts and entertainment
 Experience level or Level (video gaming), in video games and/or role-playing games
 LV (album), a live EP by the rock band Chickenfoot

Businesses and organizations
 LEVEL (airline) (IATA code LV since 2017)
 Albanian Airlines (IATA code LV, 1991–2011)
 Lehigh Valley Railroad (AAR reporting mark LV)
 Liverpool Victoria, an English friendly society, commonly known as LV=
 Louis Vuitton, a French fashion house

People
 Luther Vandross (1951–2005), American R&B singer and songwriter
 L.V. (singer) (born 1960), American R&B singer
 Lü (surname) (吕), a Chinese family name
 LV (musical duo) (2007–present), electronic music duo

Places
 Las Vegas Valley the area in Nevada that includes
 Las Vegas, a city in Nevada
 The Las Vegas Strip
 other meanings see Las Vegas (disambiguation)
 Latvia (ISO 3166 country code LV)
 Lehigh Valley, an area in Pennsylvania

Science and technology

Biology and medicine
 Left ventricle of the heart
 Left ventricular Ventricular assist device (LV unit)

Computing
 .lv, the country code top level domain (ccTLD) for Latvia
 LabVIEW, a system-design platform and development environment
 LaserVision, a home video format and optical disc storage medium
 Logical volume, in computer storage

Other uses in science and technology
 Launch vehicle, a rocket
 Light value, in photography
 Lightvessel, a ship which acts as a lighthouse
 Livermorium, symbol Lv, a chemical element
 Low voltage

Other uses
 55 (number), in Roman numerals
 Latvian language (ISO 639-1 code LV)
 Ljudski vrt, an association football stadium in Maribor, Slovenia
 Luncheon Voucher, a UK meal voucher
 Lü (surname) or Lv, romanization of Chinese name
 Argentina (aircraft registration prefix LV)
 Linking verb, a verb used to describe a subject